The 2014 Alberta Winter Games is a multi-sport event that was hosted in Banff and Canmore, Alberta on February 6–9, 2014. Approximately 2,500 athletes participated from the eight zones in Alberta. The 2014 Alberta Winter Games has one mascot.

Awarding 
The Bow Valley was awarded the 2014 Alberta Winter Games on September 7, 2011. They chose this area because the town of Banff had recently built several new state-of-the-art facilities such as the Banff Fenlands Centre which hold two skating rinks and four curling sheets.

References

Sport in Alberta
Alberta
Winter Games
Alberta Winter Games
Alberta Winter Games